Tony Kelly (born 1975) is a art photographer and director. Lived in Los Angeles, he is known for his cinematic style of photography with a luxury aesthetic and vibrant use of color.

Early life 
Born in Dublin.

Career 
Kelly began work as a photographer straight from school, covering news stories for local newspapers. At the age of twenty, he became Independent Newspapers youngest ever press photographer. Assignments to cover conflicts in Rwanda and Afghanistan for Independent Newspapers and, later, News International would shape Kelly's future approach to photography as a medium of storytelling. In 1996, his photo of a kiss between musicians Bono and Liam Gallagher won him global exposure and prompted a change in career. After his next Afghanistan trip, Kelly left the newspaper world to focus on his lifelong passions - fine art and fashion.
Kelly left Dublin for Los Angeles - "a city of pure visual stimulation" - to handle growing demand for his work in the US. By now he was honing his distinctive style in the pages of prestige publications like Vanity Fair, Vogue Paris, GQ, L'Officiel and Cosmopolitan. In 2013, he was commissioned by Playboy Magazine to deliver a series of iconic covers that would revitalize the brand. It was during this period that Kelly began to create the elaborate and extravagant set pieces that are now a signature of his work, producing daring images that blurred the boundaries of art and fashion. By 2015, having achieved international renown for his commercial work, the time had come to distill two decades of creativity into his first limited edition fine art collections. Since the successful launch of his solo career, his credo of "expression without limits" has fueled his evolution as a collectible fine artist with global appeal.

Popular appeal 
Kelly has been described as “irreverent and provocative”, "spontaneous and hyper-energetic”. PHOTO magazine said his work "plays with humour and provocation" and that "his flashy style has conquered the world of fashion". Paul Solomons, Creative Director of British GQ and GQ Style magazine, described him saying “(Kelly) has carved out a distinctive style in an age where everyone seems to believe they can be photographers. He brings the pages of every publication he shoots for to life. He is a brave photographer not afraid to push directors and the talent. To say that Tony Kelly is one of a kind is an understatement.”  In the words of Marco Finazzi, Art Director of Vanity Fair, “When you need colour, irony and humor, he is the first name that comes to mind. Think big, think Tony Kelly!”

Fine art 
Kelly's artworks amplify the visual language that he honed as a photographer for luxury publications. Predominantly shot in bright sunlight, they are instantly recognizable by their dynamic compositions, saturated colors and striking contrast. Guided by his philosophy that original art can only be produced by taking risks, Kelly purposely seeks to defy boundaries, stopping at nothing to bring his creative ideas to life. Meticulously styled and rehearsed, his work revels in the excess of aspiration, representing it with wit and imagination in bold and memorable images.

Commercial work 
Kelly's unique style of fine art photography and fluency in the visual language of advertising continues to attract commissions from major luxury brands and expose his work to wider audiences. Most recently, his team traveled to Hawaii to shoot the Spectacles campaign for Snap Inc. Other notable clients include Skyy Vodka (for their 25th anniversary campaign Kelly starred in one of his own images), Estee Lauder, BMW, Ilmakiage and Steve Madden. Kelly's ability to create a smile in the mind gives his work universal resonance, whether it is displayed in private collections or on public billboards from Times Square to Sunset Boulevard.

Books 
In 2014, Kelly released his first self-published coffee table book titled Tony's Toys.  Kelly chose the self-publishing route to sidestep the constraints of commercial publishing, allowing him to reflect his signature level of extravagance – right down to the hand stitched pages.  The book is limited to a release of 900 copies + 100 special edition copies. Described by Blink magazine as "ground breaking for both its innovative layout, dimensions and the scale of the images presented, this limited edition piece cements  Kelly's position as one of the most original and provocative photographers of our time".  His second book "Taken! Entertaining Nudes by Tony Kelly" was released in September 2016 by teNeues and distributed worldwide. Maxim hailed it as "the most entertaining photo book you'll ever see", a "showcase of some of his strongest - and sexiest - work to date".

Awards 
In 2017 Kelly won Clio Awards recognition for his eye-catching print campaign to advertise the US TV series Claws. His growing stature as an international image maker won him the Monaco Influencer Awards (Visual Arts category) in 2019.

References

External links
Official Site

Living people
1975 births
Fashion photographers
Irish photographers
Fine art photographers